These are the official results of the Women's Long Jump event at the 1993 IAAF World Championships in Stuttgart, Germany. There were a total number of 38 participating athletes, with two qualifying groups and the final held on Sunday 1993-08-15.

Medalists

Records

Qualifying round
Held on Thursday 1993-08-14

Final

See also
 1991 Women's World Championships Long Jump
 1992 Women's Olympic Long Jump
 1995 Women's World Championships Long Jump

References

External links
 Results

L
Long jump at the World Athletics Championships
1993 in women's athletics